Étouffée or etouffee is a dish found in both Cajun and Creole cuisine typically served with shellfish over rice. The dish employs a technique known as smothering, a popular method of cooking in the Cajun and Creole areas of southwest Louisiana. Étouffée is most popular in New Orleans and in the Acadiana region of the southernmost half of Louisiana as well as the coastal counties of Mississippi, Alabama, northern Florida, and eastern Texas.

Etymology
In French, the word "étouffée" (borrowed into English as "stuffed" or "stifled") literally means "smothered" or "suffocated", from the verb "étouffer".

Description

Étouffée is a dish of shellfish, simmered in a sauce made from a light or blond roux, served over rice. It is most commonly made with shellfish, such as crab or shrimp.  The most popular version of the dish is made with crawfish. Depending on who is making it and where it is being made it is flavored with either Creole or Cajun seasonings. Although Creole and Cajun cuisines are distinct, there are many similarities.  

In the case of the Creole version of crawfish étouffée, it is made with a blond or brown roux and sometimes tomatoes are added. A blond roux is one that is cooked, stirring constantly, for approximately 5 minutes to remove the "raw" flavor of the flour and to add a slightly "nutty" flavor, while a brown roux is cooked longer (30 to 35 minutes) in order to deepen the color and flavor.

History
Around the 1950s, crawfish étouffée was introduced to restaurant goers in Breaux Bridge, Louisiana; however, the dish may have been invented as early as the late 1920s, according to some sources. Originally, crawfish étouffée was a popular dish amongst Cajuns in the bayous and backwaters of Louisiana.

See also

 List of rice dishes
 List of stews

References

American stews
Cuisine of New Orleans
Crayfish dishes
Cajun cuisine
American rice dishes
Seafood and rice dishes